Atlanta Nights is a collaborative novel created in 2004 by a group of science fiction and fantasy authors, with the express purpose of producing an unpublishably bad piece of work, so as to test whether publishing firm PublishAmerica would still accept it. It was accepted; after the hoax was revealed, the publisher withdrew its offer.

The primary purpose of the exercise was to test PublishAmerica's claims to be a "traditional publisher" that would only accept high-quality manuscripts. Critics had long claimed that PublishAmerica is actually a vanity press that paid no special attention to the sales potential of the books they published, since most of their revenue came from the authors rather than book buyers. PublishAmerica had previously made some derogatory public remarks about science fiction and fantasy writers, because many of their critics came from those communities; those derogatory remarks influenced the decision to make such a public test of PublishAmerica's claims.

Background 
PublishAmerica described itself as a "traditional publisher" and claimed to accept only high-quality manuscripts for publication. Its website further stated that the company received over 70 manuscripts a day and rejected most of them.

At one point, PublishAmerica posted articles on their AuthorsMarket website stating that, among other things:

Preparation 
In retaliation, a group of science fiction and fantasy authors under the direction of James D. Macdonald collaborated on a deliberately low-quality work, complete with obvious grammatical errors, nonsensical passages, and a complete lack of a coherent plot. The effort was partly inspired by another collaborative "hoax" work, Naked Came the Stranger, as the working title of Atlanta Nights was Naked Came the Badfic.

The distinctive flaws of Atlanta Nights include nonidentical chapters written by two different authors from the same segment of outline (13 and 15), a missing chapter (21), two chapters that are word-for-word identical (4 and 17), two different chapters with the same chapter number (12 and 12), and a chapter "written" by a computer program that generated random text based on patterns found in the previous chapters (34). Characters change gender and race; they die and reappear without explanation.  Spelling and grammar are nonstandard and the formatting is inconsistent.  The initials of characters who were named in the book spelled out the phrase "PublishAmerica is a vanity press."

Under Macdonald's direction, the denouement, which takes place in the middle of the book, revealed that all the previous events of the plot had been a dream, although the book continues for several more chapters.

Submission 
The completed manuscript was offered to PublishAmerica by an unrevealed person not usually associated with fiction. The manuscript was accepted for publication on December 7, 2004. The hoaxers reviewed the contract with legal counsel, and made the decision not to carry the hoax through to actually publishing the book.

On January 23, 2005, the authors publicly revealed the hoax, and PublishAmerica retracted its acceptance the following day, stating that after "further review" the novel failed to meet their standards.

Publication 
The authors subsequently published the book through print on demand publisher Lulu under the pseudonym "Travis Tea" with all profits going to the Science Fiction and Fantasy Writers of America Emergency Medical Fund. Teresa Nielsen Hayden's review said, "The world is full of bad books written by amateurs. But why settle for the merely regrettable? Atlanta Nights is a bad book written by experts."

Authors
The authors of the chapters of this book include:

Film
The book and the story behind it were optioned for a film in February 2011 by producing team Roy C. Booth and Rachael Saltzman, who were also slated to co-write and co-direct the film.  The options money has gone to the SFWA Emergency Medical Fund. Production was tentatively scheduled to begin August 2011, but on May 16, 2011 the crowd funding campaign ended without reaching its goal.

See also

 The Eye of Argon

References

External links

Travis Tea -- The Official Website
Contract offered by PublishAmerica
 Full text of Atlanta Nights at the website of contributor Andrew Burt

2005 novels
Literary forgeries
Collaborative novels
Internet memes
Works published under a pseudonym
Self-published books